Porina linearispora is a species of corticolous (bark-dwelling) lichen in the family Trichotheliaceae. Found in Brazil, it was formally described as a new species in 2013 by lichenologists André Aptroot and Marcela Cáceres. The type specimen was collected by the authors from the Parque Natural Municipal de Porto Velho (Porto Velho, Rondônia), where it was found growing on bark in a primary rainforest. The lichen is distinguished from other members of genus Porina by its long and thin ascospores, for which the species is named.

Description

The corticate thallus of Porina linearispora is smooth, shiny, and thin, with a green color and no visible warts. A continuous black  is present below, surrounded by a shiny white  line. The lichen has  ascomata that are simple, dispersed, hemispherical, and emergent, with a diameter ranging from 0.2 to 0.3 mm. The colour of the ascomata is brown, and they are fully immersed in thallus warts of 0.3–0.4 mm in diameter. The wall of the ascomata is brown, and KOH negative. The ostioles are pale brown and apical. The  is not inspersed. The ascospores are hyaline,  with rounded ends, and measure 75–90 by 1.5–2.0 μm; they typically have 9 septa (internal partitions), although that number ranges between 7 and 13. There is no surrounding gelatinous layer around the ascospores.

References

Gyalectales
Lichen species
Lichens described in 2013
Lichens of Brazil
Taxa named by André Aptroot
Taxa named by Marcela Cáceres